Hindu High School, Muthukrishnaperi is a high school in Muthukrishnaperi, Tirunelveli District, Tamil Nadu, India. It was established in 1929.

External links

High schools and secondary schools in Tamil Nadu
Education in Tirunelveli district
Educational institutions established in 1929
1929 establishments in India